, son of Takatsukasa Norihira and adopted son of regent Michifusa, was a kugyō or Japanese court noble of the Edo period (1603–1868). Unlike other members of the family, he did not hold regent positions kampaku and sesshō. He married a daughter of Kujō Michifusa.

Family
Father: Takatsukasa Norihira
Mother: Reizei Tamemitsu’s daughter
Foster Father: Kujō Michifusa
Wife: Kujō Tokihime, daughter of the regent Kujō Michifusa
Concubine: unknown
Children:
 Kujō Sukezane by Tokihime
 Nijō Tsunahira by Concubine
 Jūnyo (1673-1739)

References
 

1641 births
1677 deaths
Fujiwara clan
Kujō family